The 1989 Lincolnshire County Council election was held on Thursday, 4 May 1989. The whole council of 76 members was up for election and the election resulted in the Conservative Party retaining control of the council and winning the same number of seats as the previous election in 1985, with 39 seats.

Results by division
Each electoral division returned one county councillor. The candidate elected to the council in each electoral division is shown in the table below. "Unopposed" indicates that the councillor was elected unopposed.

References

1989
1989 English local elections
1980s in Lincolnshire